Büyü (The Spell) is a 2004 Turkish horror film directed by Orhan Oğuz.

Though the film was a surprise box office success, it received very poor reviews.

Plot 

A group of archeologists go into a ghost village that is cursed by its past. They ignore the warnings of the natives, but soon after they arrive, terror strikes. Weird bugs come out of flames to bite Cemil, Ayadan is raped by an invisible force (she awakes from it like a dream), babies are heard crying in the air, and more unnerving incidents occur. After the unexpected murder by decapitation of Cemil, the group finally bands together to try to take on the evil forces lurking around every corner.

Cast 
Ece Uslu - Aydan   
Özgü Namal - Sedef   
İpek Tuzcuoğlu - Ayşe   
Okan Yalabık - Cemil   
Nihat İleri - Professor
Dilek Serbest - Ceren  
Suna Selen - Büyücü   
Okan Selvi - 
Serhat Tutumluer - Tarık 
Ebru Ürün - Ebru

External links 
 

2004 films
2000s Turkish-language films
2004 horror films
Films set in Turkey
2000s horror thriller films
Turkish horror thriller films
Genies in film